Claudio Rangoni (died 13 September 1619) was a Roman Catholic prelate who served as Bishop of Piacenza (1596–1619).

Biography
On 16 December 1592, Claudio Rangoni was appointed during the papacy of Pope Clement VIII as Bishop of Piacenza. On 3 December 1596, he was consecrated bishop by Girolamo Bernerio, Bishop of Ascoli Piceno and installed on 23 March 1597. He served as Bishop of Piacenza until his death on 13 September 1619.

Episcopal succession
While bishop, he was the principal co-consecrator of:

References

External links and additional sources
 (for Chronology of Bishops) 
 (for Chronology of Bishops)  

16th-century Italian Roman Catholic bishops
17th-century Italian Roman Catholic bishops
Bishops appointed by Pope Clement VIII
1619 deaths